James Whelan was shot dead on 3 April 2022 in the Deanstown area of Finglas, Dublin.

Background
A gang from the Finglas area has taken over the illicit drug dealing in that area, as well as Ballymun and Coolock. They were connected to the Kinahan Organised Crime Group and took over areas formerly run by them with the gang's blessing. Their leader in particular has close links to the Kinahan gang.

Because of their lavish lifestyle they were nicknamed "the Gucci Gang" and their leader was nicknamed "Mr. Flashy". Gardaí carried out a series of raids in 2019 against them with the support of the Garda helicopter and Armed Support Units. Small quantities of illicit drugs were found.

Gardaí were concerned in 2019 about a potential feud with another gang in west Dublin.

Victim
James Whelan was a member of the gang and had been named in court as being involved with illicit drugs. He had gotten involved with a young gang of dealers which had brought him into conflict with Mr Flashy.

Shooting
A house connected to the deceased was shot at early on Sunday morning, in response another house on the estate was petrol bombed. The deceased was shot around 4:30am that morning. Locals tried to help him until paramedics arrived, but despite both groups trying, he was declared dead at the scene.

An associate of Mr. Flashy in his early 20s is a suspect.

Aftermath
Both Gardaí and local residents fear there might be reprisal attacks.

Firebombing
On 21 May 2022 his mother and brother had to leave their house suddenly when it was firebombed at 2am in the morning. The house was extensively damaged, as were two cars outside. The family escaped without injury. The attack is believed to be the work of the gang who killed James Whelan.

References

Murder in the Republic of Ireland
2022 murders in the Republic of Ireland
2022 in the Republic of Ireland
Unsolved murders in Ireland